The women's RS:X was a sailing event on the Sailing at the 2012 Summer Olympics program in Weymouth and Portland National Sailing Academy. Eleven races (last one a medal race) were scheduled and completed. 27 sailors, on 27 boards, from 27 nations competed. Ten boards qualified for the medal race on course area Nothe in front of Weymouth, where each position scored double points.

Summary
New Zealand Yachting, the National Authority for sailing in New Zealand made the decision not to be represented in the Women's RS:X. The decision was partly based upon the fact that windsurfing would not be on the 2016 program. After the 2012 Olympics the decision to discontinue windsurfing was reverted.

Schedule

Course areas and course configurations  

For the RS:X course areas Portland, Nothe, and West were used. The location (50° 35.19’ N, 02° 26.54’ W) points to the center Portland course area, the location (50° 36.18’ N 02° 25.98’ W) points to the center of the Nothe course area and the location (50° 37.18’ N 02° 23.55’ W) points to the center of the West course area. The target time for the course was  30 minutes for the races and 20 minutes for the medal race. The race management could choose from many course configurations.

Results

Daily standings

Further reading

References 

Women's RS:X
RS:X
Olym
Women's events at the 2012 Summer Olympics